Mlimba is a town in central Tanzania on the plains.

Location
The geographical coordinates of the town are:08°46'43.0"S, 35°48'40.0"E (Latitude:-8.778611; Longitude:35.811111).

Overview
Mlimba is the largest urban centre in Mlimba Ward one of the 35 wards in Kilombero District. Mlimba is also the headquarters of Mlimba Division, one of the five administrative divisions in the district. 

There are two health facilities in town, both owned and operated by the Tanzanian government; Mlimba Hospital and a stand-alone Mlimba Maternity Centre. Also nearby is the Mlimba Institute of Allied Health Sciences, a teaching facility.

Approximately , north of Mlimba, at the border between Morogoro Region and Iringa Region, is the location of Kihansi Hydroelectric Power Station, a 180 megawatts power plant, across the Kilombero River. It is owned and operated by the government-owned power utility company, Tanesco.

Population
The population of Mlimba was estimated at 34,970, in 2016.

Tazara Railway
The Tazara Railway passes through Mlimba. After Mlimba, the line leaves the plains and enters mountainous territory, as it proceeds west.

NGOs in Mlimba 
 SolidarMed Solidar Suisse 
 Eye Care Foundation

See also

 Transport in Tanzania
 Railway stations in Tanzania

References 

Populated places in Tanzania
Cities in the Great Rift Valley
Kilombero District
Morogoro Region
Populated places in Morogoro Region